Bembidion hastii is a species of ground beetle in the family Carabidae. It is found in Europe and Northern Asia (excluding China), North America, and temperate Asia.

References

Further reading

 

hastii
Articles created by Qbugbot
Beetles described in 1827